The First Lady of the Republic of Kazakhstan , also known as First Lady of Kazakhstan is the unofficial de facto title usually attributed to the wife of the president of Kazakhstan, but because the incumbent president Kassym-Jomart Tokayev is divorced, the position is vacant. First and only person to hold the title was Sara Nazarbayeva, wife of Nursultan Nazarbayev.

Current 
The first lady position is currently vacant, since the divorce of the current president Kassym-Jomart Tokayev and Nadezhda Tokayeva in 2020.

There have been no first gentlemen of Kazakhstan to date.

History and role of the first lady 
There is no official role or office of the first lady of Kazakhstan as she is not an elected position, but usually tend to participate in humanitarian and charitable work.

Until 2019, there has been just one first lady since the country's independence in 1991, Sara Nazarbayeva, wife of President Nursultan Nazarbayev.

List of First ladies of Kazakhstan (1991–present)

Notes

References

See also 
First Lady
Kazakhstan
President of Kazakhstan

 
Kazakhstan
Kazakhstan politics-related lists
Lists of Kazakhstani people
Government of Kazakhstan